Terence Crawford vs. Shawn Porter was a welterweight professional boxing match contested between WBO welterweight champion Terence Crawford, and two-time former welterweight champion Shawn Porter. The bout took place on November 20, 2021 at the Michelob Ultra Arena in Paradise, Nevada, U.S. 11,586 fans gathered inside the Michelob Ultra Arena in Paradise, Nevada to witness Terence Crawford vs Shawn Porter.  Crawford won the bout via 10th-round technical knockout.

Background 
On July 31, 2021, the WBO ordered Terence Crawford to defend his welterweight title against the #2 ranked WBO welterweight contender Shawn Porter. The former two-time welterweight champion was seen as the biggest challenge in Crawford's career up to that point, with ESPN describing Porter as "a quantum leap in competition". As the two sides were unable to negotiate the terms of the fight, the WBO set a purse bid for September 2, 2021, which was later postponed until September 14. Crawford and Porter would adhere to a 60-40 purse split, rather than the usual 80-20 split for mandated matches, taking into account the earnings from their three previous fights.

On September 14, it was announced that a deal had been agreed to stage the fight on November 20 at the Michelob Ultra Arena at the Mandalay Bay Resort and Casino in Las Vegas, airing on ESPN+ PPV. The event will be promoted and led by Crawford's promoter Top Rank, in association with Porter's promoter Premier Boxing Champions. In adherence to the agreed 60-40 split, Crawford is guaranteed upward of $6 million, while Porter is guaranteed at least $4 million.

Fight card

Broadcasting

Notes

References 

2021 in boxing
November 2021 sports events in the United States
2021 in sports in Nevada
Boxing in Las Vegas